Magnus Wernblom (born February 3, 1973) is a Swedish former professional ice hockey forward who spent most of his active career playing for Modo Hockey in the Swedish Elitserien league, where he holds the franchise scoring record for most all-time goals (276) as well as the second highest franchise record for most games played (723). He also spent a few seasons playing for Skellefteå AIK of the same league, before returning to Modo Hockey in 2007. He announced his retirement from hockey on November 4, 2008. 
Magnus Wernblom is an icon and a cult figure in Modo Hockey.

After retirement 
17 november 2009  Magnus had his jersey number retired  at the Fjällräven Center in his native Örnsköldsvik

Career statistics

Regular season and playoffs

International

References

External links

 Meltzer, Bill. *'Mr. Modo' marches on Swedish scoring record at NHL.com Retrieved 11-04-08.

1973 births
Living people
People from Kramfors Municipality
Los Angeles Kings draft picks
Modo Hockey players
Skellefteå AIK players
Swedish ice hockey right wingers
Sportspeople from Västernorrland County